The 2022 Clemson Tigers men's soccer team represented Clemson University during the 2022 NCAA Division I men's soccer season.  They were led by head coach Mike Noonan, in his thirteenth season.  They played their home games at Riggs Field.  This was the team's 62nd season playing organized men's college soccer and their 35th playing in the Atlantic Coast Conference.

The Tigers finished the season 13–7–1 overall and 3–4–1 in ACC play to finish in fourth place in the Atlantic Division.  As the eighth overall seed in the ACC Tournament, they defeated Notre Dame in the First Round, top seed Duke in the Quarterfinals, fourth seed Wake Forest in the Semifinals and became the lowest seed to reach the final in ACC Tournament history.  They came up short in the final losing to eventual National Champion Syracuse 2–0.  They received an at large bid to the NCAA Tournament and were awarded the sixth overall seed.  After a First Round bye, they lost to UCLA in the Second Round to end their National Title defense.

Background

The Tigers finished the season 16–5–2 overall and 5–3–0 in ACC play to finish in a tie for first in the Atlantic Division.  As the second overall seed in the ACC Tournament, they defeated North Carolina in the Quarterfinals before losing to Duke in the Semifinals.  They received an at large bid to the NCAA Tournament and were awarded the eight overall seed.  After a First Round bye, they defeated Denver in overtime in the Second Round and Kentucky in the Third Round.  In the quarterfinals, they face off against top seed Oregon State, who they defeated on penalties to advance.  Penalties were required again to defeat Notre Dame in the Semifinals.  In the Final Clemson defeated Washington to win their third National Title in program history.

Player movement

Players leaving

Players arriving

Incoming Transfers

Recruiting Class

Squad

Roster

Team management

Source:

Schedule

Source:

|-
!colspan=6 style=""| Exhibition

|-
!colspan=6 style=""| Regular season

|-
!colspan=6 style=""| ACC Tournament

|-
!colspan=6 style=""| NCAA Tournament

Goals Record

Disciplinary Record

Awards and honors

2023 MLS Super Draft

Clemson had the first overall pick for the second time in four drafts.  No other school has had two top-five picks in the past four seasons.

Source:

Rankings

References

2022
2022 Atlantic Coast Conference men's soccer season
American men's college soccer teams 2022 season
2022 in sports in South Carolina
Clemson